= French ship Bergère =

18th-century French ship

History

France
- Name: Bergère

General characteristics
- Tons burthen: 300

Bergère (French feminine form of 'shepherd') was a 300-ton ship. On May 14, 1785, it transported 273 Acadians and 5 French from Nantes, France, to New Orleans, Louisiana, arriving August 15, 1785.
